Sir William Frederick Coates, 1st Baronet (1866 – 19 January 1932) was an Irish stockbroker and politician in Belfast.

Early life
Coates was born in Belfast in 1866.  He studied at the Royal Belfast Academical Institution. He was the son of David Lindsay Coates and Sara (née Mulligan) Coates.

Career
He initially entered the linen trade, but became a stockbroker in 1887, building up an extensive business known as William F. Coates & Co, stockbrokers. In 1902 he was elected to Belfast Corporation. He was chairman of the finance committee from 1917 and was elected Lord Mayor of Belfast in 1920 and then re-elected twice, serving until 1923.

He hosted the King and Queen when they visited Belfast to open the Parliament of Northern Ireland (of which he was also a Senator, both ex officio as Lord Mayor and as an elected member 1924-1929) in July 1921. For hosting the monarchs, and guiding Belfast past the sectarian conflict that marked the creation of Northern Ireland in the early 1920s, Coates was created a Baronet of Haypark. He served as Lord Mayor again from 1929 to 1931.

He served as High Sheriff of Belfast (1906–1907) and as High Sheriff of Antrim (1931–1932).

Personal life
On 27 November 1907, Coates married Elsie Millicent Gregory, daughter of Colonel Frederick William Gregory. Together, they were the parents of:

 Jean Ann Dorothy Coates, who married Thomas Roland Lecky Sinclair in 1938.
 Sir Frederick Gregory Lindsay Coates, 2nd Baronet (1916–1994), who was a Brigadier in the Royal Tank Regiment. He married Joan Nugent Spinks, daughter of Major-General Sir Charlton Watson Spinks.

Coates died on 19 January 1932 and was succeeded by his son Frederick. Upon his son's death in 1994, Sir William's grandson, David Frederick Charlton Coates (b. 1948), became the 3rd Baronet.

Arms

References

1866 births
1932 deaths
High Sheriffs of Belfast
High Sheriffs of Antrim
Politicians from Belfast
Businesspeople from Belfast
British stockbrokers
Lord Mayors of Belfast
Members of the Senate of Northern Ireland 1921–1925
Members of the Senate of Northern Ireland 1925–1929
Members of the Senate of Northern Ireland 1929–1933
Baronets in the Baronetage of the United Kingdom
Ulster Unionist Party members of the Senate of Northern Ireland